Sandla is a village in Saaremaa Parish, Saare County in western Estonia.

Before the administrative reform in 2017, the village was in Pihtla Parish.

References 

Politician and former military commander Tarmo Kõuts (born 1953) was born in Sandla.

Villages in Saare County